Samuel Horwitz (March 11, 1895 – November 22, 1955), better known by his stage name Shemp Howard, was an American comedian and actor. He was called "Shemp" because "Sam" came out that way in his mother's thick Litvak accent.

He is best known as the third Stooge in the Three Stooges, a role he played when the act began in the early 1920s (1923–1932), while it was still associated with Ted Healy and known as "Ted Healy and his Stooges"; and again from 1946 until his death in 1955. During the fourteen years between his times with the Stooges, he had a successful solo career as a film comedian, including a series of shorts by himself and with partners. He reluctantly returned to the Stooges as a favor to his brother Moe and friend Larry Fine to replace his brother Curly as the third Stooge after Curly's illness.

Early life
Howard was born Samuel Horwitz in Bensonhurst in Brooklyn, NY on March 11, 1895, and raised in Brooklyn. He was the third-born of the five Horwitz brothers born to Lithuanian Jewish parents Solomon Horwitz (1872–1943) and Jennie Horwitz (1870–1939). Irving (1891–1939) and Benjamin (Jack) (1893–1976) were his older brothers; Moses (Moe) (1897–1975) and Jerome (Curly) (1903–1952) were his younger brothers.

Howard's first name, Shmuel (after his grandfather), was anglicized to Samuel, and his parents and brothers usually called him Sam.

Career

Show business
Shemp's brother Moe Howard started in show business as a youngster, on stage and in films. Moe and Shemp eventually tried their hands as minstrel-show-style "blackface" comedians with an act they called "Howard and HowardA Study in Black". At the same time, they worked for a rival vaudeville circuit, without makeup.

By 1922, Moe had teamed up with boyhood-friend-turned-vaudeville star Ted Healy in a "roughhouse" act. One day Moe spotted his brother Shemp in the audience and yelled at him from the stage. Quick-witted Shemp yelled right back, and walked up onto the stage. From then on he was part of the act, usually known as "Ted Healy and His Stooges". The Howard brothers were the original Stooges; Larry Fine joined them in 1928. On stage, Healy sang and told jokes while his three noisy stooges got in his way, and Healy retaliated with physical and verbal abuse. Shemp played a bumbling fireman in the Stooges' first film, Soup to Nuts (1930), the only film where he played one of Healy's gang.

After a disagreement with Healy in August 1930, Moe, Larry and Shemp left to launch their own act, "Howard, Fine & Howard," and joined the RKO vaudeville circuit. They premiered at Los Angeles's Paramount Theatre on August 28, 1930. In 1931 they added "Three Lost Soles" to the act's name, and took on Jack Walsh as their straight man. Moe, Larry and Shemp continued until July 1932, when Ted Healy approached them to team up again for the Shuberts's Broadway revue "Passing Show of 1932," and they readily accepted the offer. In spite of their past differences, Moe knew an association with the nationally known Healy would provide opportunities the three comics were not getting on their own.

On August 16, 1932, in a contract dispute, Healy walked out of the Shuberts's revue during rehearsals. Three days later, tired of what he considered Healy's domineering handling of the Stooges' career, Shemp left Healy's act to remain with "Passing Show", which closed in September during roadshow performances and after pan reviews in Detroit and Cincinnati. Shemp regrouped to form his own act and played on the road for a few months. He landed at Brooklyn's Vitaphone Studios for movie appearance opportunities in May 1933. When he split from Healy, Shemp was immediately replaced by his and Moe's younger brother Jerry Howard (known as Curly).

Solo years
Shemp Howard, like many New York-based performers, found work at the Vitaphone studio in Brooklyn. Originally playing bit roles in Vitaphone's Roscoe Arbuckle comedies, showing off his comical appearance, he was given speaking roles and supporting parts almost immediately. He was featured with Vitaphone comics Jack Haley, Ben Blue and Gus Shy, then co-starred with Harry Gribbon, Daphne Pollard, and Johnnie Berkes, and finally starred in his own two-reel comedies. A Gribbon-Howard short, Art Trouble (1934), also features then-unknown James Stewart in his first film role. The independently produced Convention Girl (1935) featured Shemp in a very rare straight role as a blackmailer and would-be murderer.

Shemp seldom stuck to the script. He livened up scenes with ad-libbed dialogue and wisecracks, which became his trademark. In late 1935, Vitaphone was licensed to produce short comedies based on the "Joe Palooka" comic strip. Shemp was cast as "Knobby Walsh," and though only a supporting character, he became the comic focus of the series, with Johnnie Berkes and Lee Weber as his foils. He co-starred in the first seven shorts, released in 1936–1937. Nine of them were produced, the last two done after Shemp's departure from Vitaphone.

Away from Vitaphone, Howard unsuccessfully attempted to lead his own group of "stooges" in the Van Beuren musical comedy short The Knife of the Party. It was a rare failure in an otherwise successful solo career. In 1937 he followed his brothers' lead, moved to the West Coast, and landed supporting-actor roles at several studios, predominantly Columbia Pictures and Universal. He worked exclusively at Universal from August 1940 to August 1943, performing with such comics as W. C. Fields (playing Fields' bartender in the film The Bank Dick, 1940); and with comedy duos Abbott and Costello and Olsen and Johnson. He lent comic relief to Charlie Chan and The Thin Man murder mysteries. He appeared in several Universal B-musicals of the early 1940s, including Private Buckaroo (1942; in which he clowned onstage with The Andrews Sisters during their performance of "Don't Sit Under the Apple Tree"), Strictly in the Groove (1942), How's About It? (1943), Moonlight and Cactus (1944) and San Antonio Rose (1941), in the latter of which he was paired with Lon Chaney, Jr. as a faux Abbott and Costello. Most of these projects took advantage of his improvisational skills. When Broadway comedian Frank Fay walked out on a series of feature films teaming him with Billy Gilbert, Gilbert called on his closest friend, Shemp Howard, to replace him in three B-comedy features for Monogram Pictures, filmed in 1944–45. He also played a few serious parts, such as his supporting role in Pittsburgh (1942) starring Marlene Dietrich and John Wayne.

The Three Stooges: 1946–1955

During 1938–1940 and 1944–1946, Howard appeared in Columbia's two-reel comedies, co-starring with Columbia regulars Andy Clyde, The Glove Slingers, El Brendel, and Tom Kennedy. He was given his own starring series in 1944. He was working for Columbia in this capacity when his brother Curly was felled by a debilitating stroke on May 6, 1946. Curly had already suffered a series of strokes prior to the filming of If a Body Meets a Body (1945), and in January 1945 Shemp filled in for Curly at a week-long appearance at the St. Charles Theatre in New Orleans.

Shemp agreed to fill in for Curly in Columbia's popular Stooge shorts, knowing that if he refused, Moe and Larry would be out of work. He intended to stay only until Curly recovered, which never happened as Curly's health continued to worsen. Curly died on January 18, 1952, at the age of 48. Shemp agreed to remain with the group permanently.

Shemp's role as the third Stooge was much different from Curly's. While he could still roll with the punches in response to Moe's slapstick abuse, he was more of a laid-back dimwit as opposed to Curly's energetic man-child persona. And unlike Curly, who had many distinct mannerisms, Shemp's most notable characteristic as a Stooge was a high-pitched "bee-bee-bee-bee-bee-bee!" sound, a sort of soft screech done by inhaling. It was a multipurpose effect: He emitted this sound when scared, sleeping (done as a form of snoring), overtly happy, or dazed. It became his trademark sound as the "nyuk nyuk" sound had become Curly's. Because of his established solo career, he was also given opportunities in the films to do some of his own comic routines.

During this period, The Three Stooges ventured into live television appearances, beginning on Tuesday, October 19, 1948, with Milton Berle on his Texaco Star Theatre program.

Shemp appeared with Moe and Larry in 73 short subjects (77 when counting four that were made after Shemp's death by incorporating stock footage). The trio also made the feature film Gold Raiders (1951). Shemp suffered a mild stroke in November 1952, but recovered within weeks. The medical episode had no noticeable effect on his remaining films with the Stooges, many of which were remakes of earlier films that also used recycled footage to reduce costs.

Personal life
In September 1925, Shemp married Gertrude Frank (1905–1982), a fellow New Yorker. They had one child, Morton (1927–1972). Gertrude Frank Howard outlived her husband and son, and was living when her first cousin Barney Frank (born 1940, the son of her father's brother) became a US Congressman. 

Shemp used his somewhat homely appearance for comic effect, often mugging grotesquely or allowing his hair to fall in disarray. He even played along with a publicity stunt that named him "The Ugliest Man in Hollywood". ("I'm hideous," he explained to reporters.) Notoriously phobic, his fears included airplanes, automobiles, dogs, and water. According to Moe's autobiography, Shemp was involved in a driving accident as a teenager and never obtained a driver's license.

Death

On November 22, 1955, Shemp went out with associates Al Winston and Bobby Silverman to a boxing match (one of Shemp's favorite pastimes) at the Hollywood Legion Stadium at North El Centro and Selma Avenues, one block above the Hollywood Palladium. While returning home in a taxi that evening, Shemp died of a massive heart attack, at the age of 60. 

Moe's autobiography gives a death date of November 23, 1955, as do most subsequent accounts, because of Moe's book. But much of that book was finished posthumously by his daughter and son-in-law, and some details were confused. The Los Angeles County Coroner's death certificate states that Shemp Howard died on Tuesday, November 22, 1955, at 11:35 [PM] PST. Howard's obituary also appeared in the November 23 afternoon editions of Los Angeles newspapers, citing the death on the night of November 22. A different account is offered by his daughter-in-law Geri Greenbaum, wife of his son, who says Howard's death happened just as their taxi came over the rise on Barham Boulevard, heading to Howard's Toluca Lake home.

Shemp Howard was interred in a crypt in the Indoor Mausoleum at the Home of Peace Cemetery in East Los Angeles. His younger brother Curly is also interred there, in an outdoor tomb in the Western Jewish Institute section, as well as his parents Solomon and Jennie Horwitz and older brother Benjamin "Jack".

Tributes
The Three Stooges earned a star on the Hollywood Walk of Fame at 1560 Vine Street on August 30, 1983.

The "Fake Shemps" and legacy

Columbia had promised exhibitors eight Three Stooges comedies for 1956, but only four were completed at the time of Shemp Howard's death. To fulfill the contract, producer Jules White manufactured four more shorts by reusing old footage of Howard and filming new connecting scenes with a double, longtime Stooge supporting actor, Joe Palma, who is seen mostly from the back.

Palma came to be known by Stooge fans as the "Fake Shemp". Later, director Sam Raimi and his childhood friend actor Bruce Campbell referred to anyone playing body doubles or stand-ins in other films as "Shemp" or "a Fake Shemp", in reference to these postmortem Stooge scenes.

The re-edited films range from clever to blatantly patchy, and are often dismissed as second-rate. Rumpus in the Harem borrows from Malice in the Palace, Hot Stuff from Fuelin' Around, and Commotion on the Ocean from Dunked in the Deep (all originals released 1949; all re-edits released 1956). The best-received and most technically accomplished is Scheming Schemers (again 1956), combining new footage with recycled clips from three old Stooge shorts: A Plumbing We Will Go (1940), Half-Wits Holiday (1947) and Vagabond Loafers (1949).

When it was time to renew the Stooges's contract, Columbia hired comedian Joe Besser to replace Shemp. Columbia discontinued filming new Stooge short subject comedies in December 1957, releasing the last new short in June 1959, but kept the series going into the 1960s by reissuing Shemp's Stooge shorts to theaters. This, as well as a TV release of Stooge shorts, allowed Shemp Howard to remain a popular star for long after he died.

In the television biopic film The Three Stooges (2000), Shemp Howard was portrayed by John Kassir, who donned a floppy, straight-haired wig.

Filmography (Non-Stooge)

Features
 Soup to Nuts (1930)
 Convention Girl (1935)
 Hollywood Round-Up (1937)
 Headin' East (1937) 
 Behind Prison Gates (1939)
 Another Thin Man (1939)
 The Lone Wolf Meets a Lady (1939)
 The Leather Pushers (1939)
 Give Us Wings (1939)
 The Bank Dick (1939)
 Murder Over New York (1939) 
 Millionaires in Prison (1940)
 The Invisible Woman (1940) 
 Six Lessons from Madame La Zonga (1941)
 Buck Privates (1941)
 Hold That Ghost (1941)
 Meet the Chump (1941)
 Road Show (1941)
 Mr. Dynamite (1941)
 The Flame of New Orleans (1941)
 Too Many Blondes (1941)
 In the Navy (1941) 
 Tight Shoes (1941) 
 San Antonio Rose (1941) 
 Hit the Road (1941)
 Cracked Nuts (1941) 
 Hellzapoppin' (1941)
 Butch Minds the Baby (1942) 
 The Strange Case of Doctor Rx (1942) 
 Mississippi Gambler (1942)
 Private Buckaroo (1942) 
 Strictly in the Groove (1942)
 Arabian Nights (1942)
 How's About It (1942) 
 Pittsburgh (1942)
 Keep 'Em Slugging (1943) 
 Crazy House (1943)
 Three of a Kind (1943)
 Moonlight and Cactus (1943)
 Strange Affair (1944)
 Crazy Knights (1944)
 Trouble Chasers (1945)
 The Gentleman Misbehaves (1946) 
 One Exciting Week (1946)
 Dangerous Business (1946)
 Blondie Knows Best (1946) 
 Africa Screams (1949)
 Gold Raiders (1951)
Two Reelers
 Salt Water Daffy (1933)
 Close Relations (1933)
 Paul Revere, Jr. (1933) 
 Gobs Of Fun (1933) 
 In The Dough (1933)
 Here Comes Flossie! (1934)
 Howd' Ya Like That? (1934)
 Henry The Ache (1934)
 The Wrong, Wrong Trail (1934)
 Mushrooms (1934)
 The Knife Of The Party (1934) 
 Everybody Likes Music (1934)
 Pugs and Kisses (1934)
 Very Close Veins (1934)
 Pure Feud (1934)
 Corn On The Cop (1934)
 I Scream (1934)
 Rambling 'Round Radio Row # 7 (Series 2 # 1) (1934)
 Art Trouble (1934)
 My Mummy's Arms (1934)
 Daredevil O'Dare (1934)
 Smoked Hams (1934)
 So You Won't T-T-T-Talk (1934)
 Dizzy & Daffy (1934)
 A Peach Of A Pair, (1934)
 His First Flame (1935)
 Convention Girl (1935)
 Why Pay Rent? (1935)
 Serves You Right (1935) 
 On The Wagon (1935) 
 The Officer's Mess (1935)
 While The Cat's Away (1936)
 For The Love Of Pete (1936)
 Absorbing Junior (1936)
 Here's Howe (1936)
 Punch And Beauty (1936)
 The Choke's On You (1936)
 The Blonde Bomber (1936)
 Kick Me Again (1937)
 Taking The Count (1937)
 Hollywood Round-Up (1937)
 Headin' East (1937)
 The Leather Pushers (1938)
 Home On The Rage (1938)
 Behind Prison Gates (1939)
 Glove Slingers (1939)
 Money Squawks (1940)
 The Lone Wolf Meets A Lady (1940)
 Boobs In The Woods (1940)
 Millionaires In Prison (1940)
 Pleased To Mitt You (1940)
 Pick A Peck Of Plumbers (1944)
 Open Season For Saps (1944)
 Off Again, On Again (1945)
 Where The Pest Begins (1945)
 A Hit With A Miss (1945)
 Mr. Noisy (1946)
 Jiggers, My Wife (1946)
 Society Mugs (1946)
 Bride And Gloom (1947)
with The Three Stooges
 Fright Night (1947)
 Out West (1947)
 Hold That Lion! (1947) (His brother Curly Howard in a cameo)
 Brideless Groom (1947) 
 Sing a Song of Six Pants (1947) 
 All Gummed Up (1947)
 Shivering Sherlocks (1948)
 Pardon My Clutch (1948)
 Squareheads of the Round Table (1948)
 Fiddlers Three (1948)
 The Hot Scots (1948)
 Heavenly Daze (1948)
 I'm a Monkey's Uncle (1948)
 Mummy's Dummies (1948)
 Crime on Their Hands (1948)
 The Ghost Talks! (1949)
 Who Done It? (1949)
 Hokus Pokus (1949)
 Fuelin' Around (1949)
 Malice in the Palace (1949) (brother Curly Howard's second cameo as a Chef filmed but not used)
 Vagabond Loafers (1949) 
 Dunked in the Deep (1949)
 Punchy Cowpunchers (1950)
 Hugs and Mugs (1950)
 Dopey Dicks (1950)
 Love at First Bite (1950)
 Self-Made Maids (1950)
 Three Hams on Rye (1950)
 Studio Stoops (1950)
 Slaphappy Sleuths (1950)
 A Snitch in Time (1950)
 Three Arabian Nuts (1951)
 Baby Sitters Jitters (1951)
 Don't Throw That Knife (1951)
 Scrambled Brains (1951)
 Merry Mavericks (1951)
 The Tooth Will Out (1951)
 Hula-La-La (1951)
 Pest Man Wins (1951)
 A Missed Fortune (1952) 
 Listen, Judge (1952)
 Corny Casanovas (1952)
 He Cooked His Goose (1952)
 Gents in a Jam (1952)
 Three Dark Horses (1952)
 Cuckoo on a Choo Choo (1952) 
 Up in Daisy's Penthouse (1953) 
 Booty and the Beast (1953) 
 Loose Loot (1953) 
 Tricky Dicks (1953) 
 Spooks! (1953) (first flat widescreen short)
 Pardon My Backfire (1953)
 Rip, Sew and Stitch (1953) 
 Bubble Trouble (1953) 
 Goof on the Roof (1953)
 Income Tax Sappy (1954)
 Musty Musketeers (1954) 
 Pals and Gals (1954) 
 Knutzy Knights (1954) 
 Shot in the Frontier (1954)
 Scotched in Scotland (1954) 
 Fling in the Ring (1955) 
 Of Cash and Hash (1955) 
 Gypped in the Penthouse (1955)
 Bedlam in Paradise (1955) 
 Stone Age Romeos (1955) 
 Wham-Bam-Slam! (1955) 
 Hot Ice (1955) 
 Blunder Boys (1955)
 Husbands Beware (1956)
 Creeps (1956) 
 Flagpole Jitters (1956) 
 For Crimin' Out Loud (1956) 
 Rumpus in the Harem (1956) (“Fake Shemp”; filmed after his death)
 Hot Stuff (1956) (“Fake Shemp”; filmed after his death)
 Scheming Schemers (1956) (“Fake Shemp”; filmed after his death)
 Commotion on the Ocean'' (1956) (“Fake Shemp”; filmed after his death)

References

External links

 
 
 

1895 births
1955 deaths
Male actors from New York City
Jewish American comedians
American male comedians
20th-century American comedians
American male film actors
American people of Lithuanian-Jewish descent
American male stage actors
American male television actors
Burials at Home of Peace Cemetery
People from Manhattan
The Three Stooges members
Vaudeville performers
Jewish American male actors
20th-century American male actors
American male comedy actors
Universal Pictures contract players
Columbia Pictures contract players